John W. Donaldson (1924–2008) was a brigadier general in the United States Army. He served in World War II, the Korean War and the Vietnam War.

On 2 June 1971, Donaldson was charged with the murder of six Vietnamese civilians during operations in November 1968-January 1969 while flying in his helicopter over Quảng Ngãi Province. A colonel at the time of the alleged crimes, he was the first U.S. general charged with war crimes since General Jacob H. Smith in 1902 and the highest ranking American to be accused of war crimes during the Vietnam War. The charges against Donaldson were dropped for lack of evidence. 

Donaldson died on August 13, 2008 at the age of 84.

References

1924 births
2008 deaths
United States Army personnel of World War II
United States Army personnel of the Korean War
United States Army personnel of the Vietnam War
United States Army generals
People indicted for war crimes